Speyer may refer to:

Places 

 Speyer, a city in Germany

People 
 The Speyer family, a prominent Jewish family of German descent 
 Chris Speyer (ice hockey) (1902–1966), Canadian hockey player
 Chris Speyer (politician) (born 1941), Canadian politician, Member of Parliament from 1979 to 1988
 Jacob Samuel Speyer (1849–1913), Dutch philologist

See also 
Speier
Spier, a town in the Netherlands
Spire (disambiguation) 
Spires (disambiguation) 
Speer (disambiguation)